Sally Cooper (born 12 October 1978) is an Australian former cricketer. She played 42 matches for the Queensland Fire in the Women's National Cricket League. Cooper played seven One Day Internationals for the Australia national women's cricket team.

References

External links
 Sally Cooper at southernstars.org.au

Living people
1978 births
Australia women One Day International cricketers